Elections to the Rajasthan Legislative Assembly were held in February 1967, to elect members of the 184 constituencies in Rajasthan, India. The Indian National Congress won the most seats as well as the popular vote, and its leader, Mohan Lal Sukhadia was reappointed as the Chief Minister of Rajasthan for his fourth term.

After the passing of The Delimitation of Parliamentary and Assembly Constituencies Order, 1961, Rajasthan's Legslative Assembly was assigned 176 constituencies. This was increased to 184 constituencies by 1967.

Result

Elected Members

Bypolls

See also 
 List of constituencies of the Rajasthan Legislative Assembly
 1967 elections in India

References

Rajasthan
1967
1967